Universal Studios Singapore (abbreviation: USS) is a theme park located within the Resorts World Sentosa integrated resort at Sentosa, Singapore. It features 28 rides, shows, and attractions in seven themed zones. It is one of the six Universal Studios theme parks around the world.

It was a key component of the Genting Singapore's bid for the right to build Singapore's second integrated resort (IR). On 8 December 2006, the Singapore government announced that the consortium had won the bid. Construction of the theme park and the rest of the resort started on 19 April 2007. It is the second Universal Studios theme park in Asia, the other being Universal Studios Japan in Osaka, and the first in Southeast Asia. Official plans for the park were first unveiled to the public when Universal Studios Singapore released a map of the entire park on 20 October 2009. Universal Studios Singapore attracted more than 2 million visitors in the 9 months from its opening.

The park officially began operations on 28 May 2011. Over 3 million guests visited the park in its opening year. Since then, Universal Studios Singapore has had approximately 4 million visitors every year. Most visitors are local Singaporeans as well as tourists from other Asian countries in the region. It has been marketed by Universal Destinations & Experiences as a "one-of-its-kind theme park in Asia" and that the park was the only one of its kind in Southeast Asia for the foreseeable future. According to the AECOM Theme Index Global Attraction Attendance Report, Universal Studios Singapore is one of the top visited amusement/theme parks worldwide.

History

Park history
The construction of Resorts World Sentosa and Universal Studios Singapore began on 19 April 2008. After almost two years of construction, the park opened on 18 March 2010.

Universal Studios Singapore was opened for "sneak peek week" in view of the Chinese New Year Celebrations, from 5 pm to 9 pm every night between 14 and 21 February 2010. Though visitors had to pay SGD$10 to enter the park even-though rides were not operating, tickets for the week were sold out in 2 days. On 5 March 2010, it was announced that the park will open its doors at 8:28 am (UTC+8) on 18 March 2010, for a soft-opening phase. From 13 March 2010, the team members of Resorts World Sentosa and their families had a chance to visit the park before the public has a chance to do so. The park had its soft opening period from 18 March 2010 to 26 October 2010.

The official grand opening of the park was held on 28 May 2011, along with the "grand opening gala" being held on 27 May 2011 evening. It had Asian personalities Jet Li, Maggie Cheung, Zhao Wei, and former American Idol judge Paula Abdul making an appearance at the gala event, along with some 1,600 guests.

On 21 October 2011, Universal Studios Singapore began their Halloween Horror Nights events.

On 3 April 2019, Genting Group announced the expansion of Universal Studios Singapore with two new themed areas, Minion Land and Super Nintendo World.

Timeline

Attendance

Park layout

There are a total of 24 attractions, of which 18 are original or specially adapted for the park. The park consists of six themed zones surrounding a lagoon. Each zone is mostly based on movies and/or television, featuring their own attractions, meet and greet locations, over 30 restaurants and food carts, and 20 retail stores and carts located around the park.

Hollywood

Hollywood is the main entrance area of the park. Its only attraction, a broadway-style theatre, is accompanied by several restaurants and a variety of shopping locations. The zone is filled with Hollywood-inspired architecture and palm trees, including a replica of the Hollywood Walk of Fame.

Parade
Hollywood Dreams Light-Up Parade This parade features themed floats, characters, and performers based on the Woody Woodpecker, Madagascar, Shrek, Jurassic Park and The Mummy franchises.

Meet & Greets
 Hollywood Walk of Fame (including Woody and Winnie Woodpecker, Bugs Bunny, Lola Bunny, Daffy Duck, Tina Russo, Porky Pig, Petunia Pig, Elmer Fudd, Tweety, Sylvester the Cat, Granny, Yosemite Sam, Foghorn Leghorn, Marvin the Martian, K-9, Pepé Le Pew, Speedy Gonzales, Tasmanian Devil, Road Runner, Wile E. Coyote, Michigan J. Frog and Gossamer from Looney Tunes, Gru, Dru, Margo, Edith, Agnes, Vector, Minions and Lucy Wilde from Despicable Me, Marilyn Monroe, Charlie Chaplin, Beetlejuice, Frankenstein's Monster, Count Dracula, The Bride of Frankenstein, The Mummy, The Wolf Man, Betty Boop, Bear from Bear in the Big Blue House, Dora the Explorer, Boots, Diego and Baby Jaguar, Blue, Magenta, Periwinkle and Rainbow Puppy from Blue's Clues, Tommy Pickles, Chuckie Finster and Angelica Pickles from Rugrats, Lincoln, Lori, Leni, Luna, Luan, Lynn and Lucy Loud from The Loud House, Ronnie Anne and Bobby Santiago with Sid Chang from The Casagrandes, Garfield, Odie and Jon Arbuckle, Max, Ruby, Grace, Oliver, Mom, Dad and Grandma from Max & Ruby, Molly, Gil, Goby, Deema, Oona, Nonny, Zooli and Bubble Puppy from Bubble Guppies, Marshall, Rubble, Chase, Rocky, Zuma, Skye and Everest from PAW Patrol, Po the Panda and Tigress from Kung Fu Panda, Hiccup and Astrid from How to Train Your Dragon, Poppy and Branch from Trolls, The Boss Baby, Sonic the Hedgehog, Tails the Fox, Knuckles the Echidna, Amy Rose, Doctor Eggman, Shadow the Hedgehog and Rouge the Bat from Sonic the Hedgehog, Crash Bandicoot, Sly Cooper, Murray, Bentley and Carmelita Fox from Sly Cooper, Spyro the Dragon, Ratchet, Clank and Captain Qwark from Ratchet & Clank, Jak and Daxter from Jak and Daxter, Hello Kitty and Dear Daniel, Paddington Bear, Peter Rabbit, Small and Tiny from Clangers and Sportacus, Stephanie, Robbie Rotten, Ziggy, Pixel, Stingy and Trixie from LazyTown)

New York City

New York City is based on the original New York City, during the era of post-modernisation. The zone features various landmarks commonly portrayed in movies including the city skyline, neon lights, facades, and sidewalks. This zone also has a replica of the New York Public Library. Special Sesame Street character appearances include: Elmo, Big Bird, Count von Count, Abby Cadabby, Bert, Ernie, Grover, Cookie Monster and Oscar the Grouch.

Entertainment
 Rhythm Truck

Sci-Fi City

Sci-Fi City is themed to a supposed metropolis of the future. It is the home of a pair of dueling roller coasters.

Ancient Egypt

Ancient Egypt is based on the historical adaptation of Ancient Egypt during the 1930s Golden Age of Egyptian Exploration. It features obelisks and pyramids which are typical of Ancient Egypt. Also featured are Pharaohs' tombs which were supposedly commonly discovered during that era. This zone relies on the depictions made in the popular film franchise, The Mummy, starring Brendan Fraser.

The Lost World

The Lost World contains many traditional attractions present in most Universal Studios parks around the world and is divided into two sub-areas: Jurassic Park and Waterworld. Jurassic Park, based on the popular film franchise by Steven Spielberg and novels by Michael Crichton, features the newly redesigned Jurassic Park Rapids Adventure which is based on the water rides in other Universal Studios parks. Waterworld, based on the film Waterworld starring Kevin Costner, features a live show performance at an amphitheater.

Far Far Away

Far Far Away is inspired by DreamWorks Animation's Shrek franchise. The zone consists of many locations from the film series, with a landmark in the form of "Far Far Away Castle". Character appearances include: Shrek, Donkey, Puss in Boots, Princess Fiona, Pinocchio and Prince Charming.

Upcoming attractions

Minion Land
Minion Land is inspired by Despicable Me.

In addition, there will be a variety of "themed shops and restaurants" in this area. Construction began in the second quarter of 2022, and it is set to open at some point in 2024.

Super Nintendo World
Super Nintendo World is inspired by Super Mario.

While it is currently unknown if this iteration of Super Nintendo World will be similar to Universal Studios Hollywood's version or Universal Studios Japan's version or a completely new version altogether, it is confirmed that it will include the Mario Kart: Bowser's Challenge ride, as well as dining outlets and merchandise stores. It is set to open in 2025.

Former attractions

Madagascar
Madagascar was inspired by the DreamWorks Animation franchise of the same name. The zone featured a tropical jungle theming as well as two rides. The majority of this land closed on the 27 March 2022, with the exception of the carousel King Julien's Beach Party-Go-Round, which will be re-themed and re-decorated with Despicable Me characters and renamed to Minion Carousel Ride. Character appearances included Alex, Gloria, King Julien, Skipper, Kowalski, Private and Rico.

Notes

References

External links

 

 
Amusement parks in Singapore
2011 establishments in Singapore
Amusement parks opened in 2011